Édouard-Henri Avril  (21 May 1849 – 28 July 1928) was a French painter and commercial artist. Under the pseudonym Paul Avril, he was an illustrator of erotic literature. His career saw collaboration with influential people like Octave Uzanne, Henry Spencer Ashbee and Friedrich Karl Forberg.

Avril was a soldier before starting his career in art. He was awarded with the Legion of Honour for his actions in the Franco-Prussian War.

Life
Avril was born in Algiers. His father was a colonel of the gendarmerie. Avril himself fought and was wounded in the Franco-Prussian War before starting his studies in art. He was awarded with the Legion of Honour on 31 May 1871 for injuries sustained during the war. The injuries resulted in retirement from his military career on 23 January 1872.

Biographical material of his life is scarce due to the obscene nature of his work, and because he worked under a pseudonym of "Paul Avril". His pseudonym can lead to a confusion with his brother, who was named Paul-Victor Avril, and was also an artist and worked as an engraver.

From 1874 to 1878 he was at the École des Beaux-Arts in Paris. He worked for the illustrated newsmagazine Le Monde illustré in 1882.

Having been commissioned to illustrate Théophile Gautier's novel Fortunio, he adopted the pseudonym "Paul Avril". His reputation was soon established and he received many commissions to illustrate both major authors and the so-called "galante literature" of the day, a form of erotica. However, his reputation as a commercial illustrator of novels was established before he began illustrating the more underground erotic literature. These books were typically sold in small editions on a subscription basis, organised by collectors. Erotica of that time received very limited prints and sometimes were limited to only 100 or so copies, or were sold only within exclusive circles of collectors.

Because of the perceived obscenity of Avril and his works, it is difficult to assess the impact that his art might have had on the culture of the time.

Avril died at Le Raincy, near Paris, in 1928.

Works

Avril's major work were the illustrations in 1906 for De Figuris Veneris: A Manual of Classical Erotica. Another important work illustrated by Avril was John Cleland's Fanny Hill (also known as Memoirs of a Woman of Pleasure), which was a significant and controversial publication of its time as it was the first novel to bring erotica to English literature. The book's edition illustrated by Avril includes Les charmes de Fanny exposés that is one of his better known pictures. He illustrated such works as Gustave Flaubert's Salammbô, Gautier's Le Roi Caundale, Jean Baptiste Louvet de Couvray's Adventures of the Chevalier de Faublas, Mario Uchard's Mon Oncle Barbassou (scenes in a harem), Jules Michelet's The Madam, Hector France's Musk, Hashish and Blood, the writings of Pietro Aretino, and the anonymous lesbian novel Gamiani.

Classicizing works illustrated by Avril include Oeuvres d’Horace (1887), Une nuit de Cléopâtre (1894), Daphnis et Chloé (1898), and Les sonnets luxurieux de l’Aretin (1904). Avril might be best known for his sapphic, or lesbian, illustrations.

Prolific erotica collector Henry Spencer Ashbee commissioned Avril to design a bookplate for him. Avril worked with Octave Uzanne, who after leaving the Société des Amis des Livres, which he found too conservative and too concerned with the reissue of old works, started two new bibliographic societies. The Société des Bibliophiles Contemporaines (1889–1894) consisted of 160 people from literary circles, including Avril.

List of works and editions illustrated
L'Éventail (1882)
L'Ombrelle – Le Gant – Le Manchon (1883)
Fortunio (1883)
Adventures of the Chevalier de Faublas (1884)
Mon Oncle Barbassou (Scenes in a Harem) (1884)
Fanny Hill (fr. 1887, eng. 1906)
Oeuvres d’Horace (1887)
The Mirror of the World (1888)
Le Roi Caundale (1893)
Une nuit de Cléopâtre (1894)
The Life and Adventures of Father Silas (1896)
Daphnis et Chloé (1898)
Musk, Hashish and Blood (1899)
Les Sonnets Luxurieux de l’Aretin (1904)
Gamiani (1905)
De Figuris Veneris: A Manual of Classical Erotica (1906)
Salammbô (1906)
Histoire de Saturnin (1908)
The Madam

Gallery

See also

John Martin
Louis Legrand
Martin van Maële
L'Origine du monde by Gustave Courbet

References

External links 

 Avril's Gallery of Classical Erotica
 A Checklist of Works Illustrated by Paul Avril (46 items)
 Records at Legion of Honour

1849 births
1928 deaths
People from Algiers
French illustrators
19th-century French painters
19th-century French male artists
French male painters
20th-century French painters
20th-century French male artists
French erotic artists
École des Beaux-Arts alumni
French military personnel of the Franco-Prussian War